A runabout is a small vehicle:

 Runabout (boat), a small boat
 Runabout (PWC), a sit down style personal watercraft.
 Runabout (car), an antique car body style, and the name of a 1964 concept car
 Runabout (carriage), a type of horse-drawn vehicle
 Runabout (series), a series of destruction driving video games
 Runabout (Star Trek), a type of spacecraft in the Star Trek universe